Felipe Martins may refer to:

 Felipe Martins (footballer, born September 1990), Felipe Campanholi Martins, Brazilian football midfielder
 Felipe Martins (footballer, born November 1990), Felipe Santos Martins, Brazilian football striker

See also
 Felipe Trevizan (born 1987), Felipe Trevizan Martins, Brazilian football centre-back